Warrensville, Ohio can refer to:
Warrensville Heights, Ohio, a city in Cuyahoga County
Warrensville Township, Ohio, a paper township in Cuyahoga County